The Hidden Valley of Oz (1951) is the thirty-ninth in the series of Oz books created by L. Frank Baum and his successors. It was written by Rachel R. Cosgrove and illustrated by Dirk Gringhuis.

Realistic emotions
The children of the Oz books have a pronounced tendency to behave with unnatural courage and independence. Here in Hidden Valley, Dorothy Gale responds to a plan to attack a fifty-foot-tall cannibal giant with "I think it would be lots of fun." Cosgrove, however, takes pains to cast her own child protagonist, Jam, in a more realistic vein. He often expresses fear at the strange goings-on and creatures around him, and longs to return to his home and parents; his part in the denouement of the plot is fairly modest. He is more like a real child than most Oz children are. Cosgrove even offers oblique acknowledgement that Jam's parents miss him and worry about him through his days-long absence — a rare element in the Oz literature.

New characters
Almost every Oz author introduces new characters into the Oz mythos with each book; and the strength and vividness of these characters often determine the success of the book. In addition to Jam, neophyte author Cosgrove provides a range of new characters, including living books and snowmen, a mean-spirited giant, and a rhyming dictionary that spouts verse; but her most striking creations are Percy the white rat and the Leopard with the Changeable Spots.

Cosgrove chose Percy based on her experience in laboratory work; she considered lab rats "fascinating" and "clever." Percy, who calls himself "the personality kid," is an extrovert, a classic American wise guy; he calls everyone "kiddo." Cosgrove liked the character enough to use him again, in her second Oz book, The Wicked Witch of Oz, and in a short story, "Percy and the Shrinking Violet."

The great visual and esthetic triumph in the book, though, is the Leopard with the Changeable Spots. (The other characters call him "Spots" for short.) As his title indicates, the markings on his coat change, both randomly and in response to his feelings. They shift "from pink diamonds, to violet hearts, to spinning pinwheels; and so on and on...from golden snow flakes to silver crosses," plus "green apples" and "pink elephants," "red dots" and "big, black exclamation marks," "blue moons" and "electric lights." When he's in doubt, he produces "blue question marks," and when he is angry he has "brightly colored swords and muskets spinning madly on his back."

His uniqueness has made the Leopard an outcast and a pariah in the jungle; but he fits right in with the unusual beings who are Dorothy's companions, is welcomed among them, and is grateful for their acceptance.

Cosgrove used the Leopard again too, in her story "Spots in Oz."

Synopsis
Jonathan Andrew Manley, nicknamed Jam, is a boy from Ohio, the son of a biologist. At the start of the story, he is building a "collapsible kite" from plans he found in a popular magazine. Rather than cutting the pieces of his wooden frame to match the plans, however, he scales up the kite to match the size of his wood, yielding an extra-large result. The size of the thing inspires him to try to fly on it; he attaches a shipping crate, and gathers up three of his father's experimental animals (two guinea pigs and a white laboratory rat). A strong gust of wind lifts kite, crate, and passengers into the sky; Jam is on his way to the Land of Oz.

Kite and crate thump down the next day, in the purple landscape of the Gillikin Country. Jam is amazed to find that his animals can now talk; the guinea pigs call themselves Pinny and Gig, while the white rat introduces himself as Percy. Jam meets some of the inhabitants, who inform him of local conditions. This remote valley of Oz is dominated by a wrathful 50 ft. giant called Terp the Terrible, who enslaves the common people to work in his vineyards and his jam-making factory. Terp captures Jam, and is struck by his name; the giant threatens to spread the boy on his breakfast muffins the next day, and eat him. Terp imprisons the boy and his animals in the highest tower of his castle.

The courtyard of Terp's castle contains a magic muffin tree, guarded by a fierce unnamed monster that has an elephant's body, an alligator's tail, and two heads: a nocturnal owl and a diurnal wolf. In the night, Percy is able to help Jam and friends escape the tower, with the aid of a handy grapevine. Jam and his pets flee, though Percy doubles back to steal one of the magic muffins. On the Gillikin plains, Jam and friends are menaced by the Equinots, hostile centaurs; Percy frightens away the Equinots when he eats some of the magic muffin, and grows to ten times his normal size.

A local farmer and his wife provide shelter for the night; Pinny and Gig, who have little taste for adventure, decide to stay at the farm as pets of the farmer's children. Another kite flight takes Jam and Percy to the tin castle of the Emperor of the Winkies, the Tin Woodman. There, the party is soon joined by Dorothy Gale, the Scarecrow, the Cowardly Lion, and the Hungry Tiger. After hearing Jam's tale, the assembled party decide to defeat Terp and free the oppressed Gillikins.

Their path from the Winkie Country to the Hidden Valley in Gillikin Country leads through a wilderness; a commotion in the jungle brings them a new friend on their quest in the form of the Leopard with the Changeable Spots who is an outcast to his fellow leopards. They nickname him "Spots". They enter Bookville, where a hostile King and his royal court condemn them to be pressed into books. Percy gnaws the travelers a way out of their bookshelf prison during the night. Another disagreeable adventure awaits them in Icetown which is inhabited by snowmen. To escape an igloo prison, the Scarecrow volunteers his stuffing as kindling for a fire.

The travelers, with a re-stuffed Scarecrow, eventually reach the Hidden Valley in Gillikin Country. Percy's shrinking-and-growing experiences with the magic muffin have made them realize that Terp needs a steady supply of muffins to maintain his giant stature. Jam and company, with local collaboration, lure Terp away from his castle and hypnotize the guardian beast into harmlessness. The Tin Man chops down the magic tree, killing it. Terp is trapped in the smokestack of the jam factory until he shrinks to his normal size.

The party travel to the Emerald City, where Jam is welcomed as a hero. After a celebratory banquet, Ozma and the Wizard send the boy home to Ohio once more. Percy remains in Oz and convinces the Wizard to enchant him into his large size permanently.

Development
Cosgrove originally intended to have Jam travel to Oz by rocket, but the publishers informed her that that had already been done in The Yellow Knight of Oz. The revised first chapter is believed to be the work of Francis Joseph O'Donnell, one of Reilly & Lee's main editors. Cosgrove's original opening was published posthumously in an issue of Oz-story Magazine. She later gave an account of how she wrote and revised Hidden Valley and worked with the personnel at Reilly & Lee. Her article appeared in The Baum Bugle, and was later included as an Afterword in the 1991 edition of Hidden Valley. Among the trivia she remarked on in this article was that the editors had added in Jam's catchphrase "Golly" and Percy's catchphrase "Kiddo," both of which she initially disliked.

Cogrove began work on a second Oz book soon after finishing the first; but Reilly & Lee declined it, due to low sales for Oz books in the 1950s. The work would finally appear in print forty years later as The Wicked Witch of Oz.

Notes

References

External links

 On the Hidden Valley of Oz

Oz (franchise) books
1951 American novels
1951 fantasy novels
1951 children's books